Pappadiana is a community in the municipal unit of Keramia,  Chania regional unit on the island of Crete, Greece. It has 186 residents (2011 census), and consists of the villages Achlades, Gerolakkos, Loulos and Panagia.

References

Populated places in Chania (regional unit)